This list is of Major Sites Protected for their Historical and Cultural Value at the National Level in Shandong Province, China.

|}

See also
 Major historical and cultural sites protected by Shandong Province
 Principles for the Conservation of Heritage Sites in China

References

 
Shandong